Eggs Are Funny is the first compilation album from the Danish alternative band Mew. It was released in Scandinavia on 25 October 2010 and internationally on 11 January 2011 as a digital download.

The compilation includes 14 songs from previous albums as well as one new song, "Do You Love It?" The track list was compiled from what Mew consider to be their "best work."

Critical reception
The A.V. Club wrote that "it’s difficult to think of another group that’s this committed to pop songcraft, and yet that colors so far outside the lines with its music, creating a sound that really is the band’s alone."

Track listing

References

Mew (band) albums
2010 compilation albums